The Golden Hour may refer to:
 The Golden Hour (novel), a children's novel by Maiya Williams
 The Golden Hour (TV series), an ITV drama series (2005)
 The Golden Hour (album), by indie rock band Firewater
 The Golden Hour (radio feature), a feature on BBC Radio 1
 Larry Gogan's Golden Hour, a programme on Ireland's RTÉ 2fm, known also as The Golden Hour
 The Golden Hour: Under the Orange Sun, a 2022 concert headline by South Korean singer IU

See also

 Golden hour (disambiguation)